Tectin may refer to:

 Tectin (drug) - for treatment of pain
 Tectin (secretion) - a proteinaceous substance secreted by protists